Alberta Brianti was the defending champion, but chose not to participate. 
Anastasiya Yakimova won the title by defeating Erika Sema in the final 7–6(7–3), 6–3.

Seeds

Main draw

Finals

Top half

Bottom half

References
 Main Draw
 Qualifying Draw

Ningbo Challenger - Singles
2011 Women's Singles